is a former Japanese professional football player.

Playing career
Arai entered professional football with Albirex Niigata after graduating from Rissho University in 2001 but was unable to hold on to the first team place although he played 20 league games for Albirex Niigata in his first season. He was on loan to Albirex Niigata FC (Singapore) in 2004 and in 2006 he secured a permanent move to  Singapore Armed Forces FC.

He is also the second Japanese player, after his Singapore Armed Forces FC teammate Masahiro Fukasawa, to play in the AFC Champions League for a non-Japanese club. In November 2009, Kenji joined SC Goa. He returned to Singapore and joined Sengkang Punggol FC on 2010 and subsequently Home United FC in 2011.

Club statistics

Honours

Club
Albirex Niigata
J2 League: 2003

Singapore Armed Forces
S.League: 2006, 2007, 2008, 2009
Singapore Cup: 2007, 2008

Videos
youtube.com

References

External links

ameblo.jp (Official blog)
data2.7m.cn

1978 births
Living people
Rissho University alumni
Association football people from Saitama Prefecture
Japanese footballers
J2 League players
Singapore Premier League players
Albirex Niigata players
Albirex Niigata Singapore FC players
Hougang United FC players
Home United FC players
Japanese expatriate footballers
Japanese expatriate sportspeople in Singapore
Expatriate footballers in Singapore
Association football defenders